Fayyad is a settlement in Fujairah, United Arab Emirates (UAE)

Populated places in the Emirate of Fujairah